The 1961 United States Senate special election in Texas was held on May 27, 1961. The election was held to replace outgoing Senator Lyndon B. Johnson, who had been elected Vice President of the United States.

Republican John Tower, who had been the nominee for the regularly scheduled election in 1960, defeated seventy other candidates to become the first Republican to represent Texas in the Senate since Reconstruction. Tower was also the first post-Reconstruction Republican to win a statewide election in Texas, the first to win a Senate popular election in a former Confederate state, and the third to win any election to the Senate from the former Confederacy.

Primary election

Candidates
Seventy-one candidates were on the ballot for the primary election. At the time, the filing fee for ballot access was only $50.

The primary was held on April 4.

Major candidates
William A. Blakley (Democrat), incumbent appointee Senator
Henry B. Gonzalez (Democrat), State Senator from San Antonio
Maury Maverick Jr. (Democrat), attorney and former State Representative
John Tower (Republican), political science professor at Midwestern State University and nominee for U.S. Senate in 1960
Will Wilson (Democrat), Attorney General of Texas
Jim Wright (Democrat), U.S. Representative from Fort Worth

Minor candidates
None of these candidates received more than 0.5% of the popular vote.

Runoff election

Results

References 

1961
Texas
United States Senate
Texas 1961
Texas 1961
United States Senate 1961